Edward Miller (31 May 1908 – 26 August 1965) was a Polish footballer. He played in one match for the Poland national football team in 1936.

References

External links
 

1908 births
1965 deaths
Polish footballers
Poland international footballers
Place of birth missing
Association footballers not categorized by position